Conrad Orzel (born July 11, 2000) is a Canadian figure skater and model. He is the 2019 Bavarian Open silver medallist and 2023 Canadian national silver medallist. Earlier in his career, he won two medals on the ISU Junior Grand Prix series and placed 13th at the 2017 and 2018 World Junior Championships.

Personal life 
Orzel was born on July 11, 2000, in Toronto, Ontario, Canada. He is of Polish ancestry and speaks English, French, and Polish. 

Orzel studied at York University. He also models during his free time and is signed with Ciotti Models modelling agency.

Career 
Orzel began learning to skate in 2003. Eva Najarro became his coach when he was five years old. He trained at the York Region Skating Academy in Richmond Hill, Ontario until 2018 and also worked with Joanne McLeod in Vancouver, British Columbia.

2014–2015 season 
Orzel sustained a torn ligament in his left leg and an avulsion fracture before the Skate Canada Challenge in December 2014. The following month, he won bronze in the novice men's event at the 2015 Canadian Championships.

2015–2016 season 
Competing on the junior level, Orzel ranked fourth in the short program, sixth in the free skate, and fifth overall at the 2016 Canadian Championships. He hit his head on the ice during the free skate after attempting a triple Axel jump. He continued with his program and was examined afterwards by a medical team, which found no concussion. Making his international debut, he won the junior bronze medal at the Coupe du Printemps in March 2016.

2016–2017 season 
In August 2016, Orzel placed tenth at his first Junior Grand Prix (JGP) assignment in Saint Gervais-les-Bains, France, before winning silver at a JGP event in Dresden, Germany, in October. He received the junior silver medal at the 2017 Canadian Championships, having finished second to Stephen Gogolev, and was named in Canada's team to the 2017 World Junior Championships in Taipei. Competing in Taiwan, he placed eighteenth in the short program, twelfth in the free skate, and thirteenth overall.

2017–2018 season 
Orzel placed seventh at his first Junior Grand Prix assignment in Linz, Austria.  In his second event in Poland, he won the bronze medal.  Orzel moved to the senior level domestically, placing eleventh at the 2018 national championships.  He ended the season at the 2018 World Junior Championships, where he placed thirteenth again.

2018–2019 season 
Orzel decided to leave his longtime coach Eva Najarro, transferring to the Toronto Cricket, Skating & Curling Club under the tutelage of Lee Barkell.  He was again named to Skate Canada's NextGen team. Orzel placed fourth at both of his JGP assignments, coming only 0.01 points away from a bronze medal at 2018 JGP Slovenia after setting new personal bests in both the free skate and in total score.

At the 2019 Canadian Championships, Orzel placed fourth in the short program, skating completely cleanly.  He had a difficult free skate, dropping to fifth place overall. Because Orzel finished behind both Stephen Gogolev and Joseph Phan, he was not named to Canada's team for the World Junior Championships. He was instead assigned to the 2019 Bavarian Open, making his senior international debut, where he won the silver medal.

2019–2020 season 
Orzel moved to compete fully at the senior level, beginning the season at the 2019 CS Autumn Classic International, where he placed sixth.  Making his Grand Prix debut at the 2019 Cup of China, he placed eleventh.  Orzel was twelfth at the 2019 NHK Trophy and concluded his season with a sixth-place finish at the 2020 Canadian Championships.

2020–2021 season 
Orzel was assigned to compete at the 2020 Skate Canada International, but the event was cancelled as a result of the coronavirus pandemic.

With the pandemic continuing to make it difficult to hold in-person events, the 2021 Skate Canada Challenge was held virtually, and Orzel placed fifth at the event, notably placing third in the short program and landing two quadruple jumps. The 2021 Canadian Championships were subsequently cancelled.

2021–2022 season 
Orzel was assigned to begin the season at the 2021 CS Autumn Classic International, whose men's competition lost its Challenger status due to insufficient competitors and countries. Orzel won the gold medal over the two other Canadian men who competed. On the Grand Prix at 2021 Skate Canada International, Orzel placed ninth. After the free skate, he said, "even though there were some mistakes, I was still happy with the performance in general." 

At the 2022 Canadian Championships, Orzel had a difficult short program, making mistakes on all his jumping passes to place fourteenth overall in the segment. He was sixth in the free skate, rising to ninth overall.

2022–2023 season 
After underwhelming results in preceding years, Orzel opted to leave his coaches at the Toronto Cricket, Skating and Curling Club to work with Ravi Walia at the Ice Palace FSC in Edmonton, Alberta. Both he and his sister Amelia moved to Edmonton, never having lived away from home.

Orzel was assigned to the 2022 CS Finlandia Trophy, finishing eleventh. He was eleventh as well at the 2022 Skate Canada International, and tenth at the 2022 NHK Trophy.

At the 2023 Canadian Championships, Orzel placed second in the short program. He was fourth in the free skate, but remained second overall and won the silver medal. While national champion Keegan Messing was immediately named to compete at both the 2023 World Championships, the second Canadian men's berth was to be decided later, pending results at the 2023 Four Continents Championships, where both Orzel and fourth-place Stephen Gogolev were assigned. Orzel finished eighth at Four Continents, ahead of Gogolev in thirteenth.

Programs

Competitive highlights 
GP: Grand Prix; CS: Challenger Series; JGP: Junior Grand Prix

Detailed results

References

External links 
 

2000 births
Canadian male single skaters
Living people
Figure skaters from Toronto
21st-century Canadian people